Saint-Thierry Abbey was formerly a Benedictine abbey in the village of Saint-Thierry, Marne,
It was closed in the 17th century and razed to the ground during the French Revolution.
Since 1968 it has been a Benedictine nunnery in the Archdiocese of Reims.

History 

The abbey was founded by Theodoric of Mont d'Hor around 500 and dedicated to Saint Bartholomew the Apostle.
This men's abbey became Benedictine around 974 and Adalbero of Reims had Thierry's relics transferred to the monastery. 
The cult of Thierry supplanted that of Bartholomew in the long term.

It became a monastery of the Congregation of Saint Maur from 1627/1628 until its suppression. 
It was abolished on 2 April 1695 by King Louis XIV.
This was to compensate for the damage that the Church of Reims suffered during the creation of the Archdiocese of Cambrai. 
This extinction was ratified by a papal bull of Pope Innocent XII dated 13 September 1696, and it became the secondary residence of the archbishops of Reims. 
In 1777 the community was driven out and the abbey completely razed; the community being relocated for a time to Reims. 
Only the chapter house, dating from the 12th century, remained standing.

Bernard de Montfaucon made an inventory of the books of the abbey in his Bibliotheca bibliecarum manuscriptorum nova, Paris, 1739, and there are still nearly 150, mostly in the Municipal Library of Reims as well as a few copies in the Vatican Library and the Bibliothèque nationale de France

After two centuries of interruption, monastic life resumed on the hill of Saint-Thierry when the Benedictines of the Vanves congregation arrived in 1968. 
The long tradition of prayer, hospitality and work began to be reborn.

List of abbots and commendatory abbots 

 1st abbot : After 512 – 1 July 533 : Saint Theodoric of Mont d'Hor
 2nd abbot : 
 3rd abbot : 544 – 1 May 590 : Saint Théodulphe or Thiou
 The bishops of Reims reserved the right to be abbot of Saint-Thierry until introduction of the Benedictine rule
  : Airard
 988-991 : Christian
 991-992 : Adson de Montier en Der
 992 - : Josbert
 1008-1022 : Dominique
 1049-1063 : Albet
 1065-1078 : Raimbaud ou Clarembault
 1078-1088 : Richier
 1089-1112 : Raoul
 1112-1121 : Geoffroy col de cerf
 1121-1135 : William of St-Thierry
 1135-1145 : Hellin
 1145-1156 : Aldric
 1157-1167 : Albert
 1167-1186 : Herbert
 1187-1197 : Gaucher
 1197-1215 : Foulques, died in Rome during the Fourth Council of the Lateran
 1216-1233 : Millon
 1233-1261 : Gérard
 1261-1300 : Jean de Fago
 1301-1312 : Raoul de Sarcey
 1313-1337 : Jean de Dormans
 1337-1349 : Raoul de Cormicy
 1349-1361 : Clarin de Cormicy
 1360-1363 : Pierre de Marcilly
 1363-1369 : Albéric de Laporte
 1370-1395 : Guillaume de Baracan
 1396-1410 : Étienne de Meligny
 1411-1431 : Fouchard de Rochechouart
 1432-1437 : Guillaume Fillastre
 1437-1460 : Aimery de Hocquedé
 1461-1469 : Guillaume du Fou
 1469-1491 : Jean Balue
 1491-1522 : Gilles d'Ostrel
 1522-1547 : François d'Ostrel
 1568-1595 : Dominique Mangin
 1595-1599 : Jacques de Bailly
 1599-1613 : Charles de Bailly
 1613-1649 : Paul de Bailly (commendatory)
 Last abbé : Guillaume Bailly.

Gallery

Notes

Citations

Sources

 

Former Christian monasteries in France
Benedictine nunneries in France
6th-century establishments in Francia